Arnstein Johansen (June 19, 1925 – September 26, 2013) was a Norwegian accordionist that played jazz and old-fashioned dances. He became well-known through his recordings and his international collaboration.

Life
Johansen was born in Fredrikstad. He studied under Ottar E. Akre, Thorleif Ekren, and Gunnar Sønstevold, and also at the Norwegian Academy of Music. After the Second World War, he played in a duet with Rolf Andersen, and then spent time in the United States, playing with Pietro Frosini, Guido Deiro, and Anthony Galla-Rini.

He released a number of albums as a solo artist and with the Arnstein Johansen Quartet (Arnstein Johansen kvartett), later quintet: Gammeldans (Old-Fashioned Dances), Hæla i taket (Party Hardy), A.J.'s freskeste (A. J.'s Freshest), I ring og feiende sving (In Ring and Sweeping Swing), Evergreens (Golden Oldies), Tea for Two, Crazy Rhythm, Out of Nowhere, and Too Late Now. He also played with Sverre Cornelius Lund and participated in releases with Alf Prøysen and others.

Johansen composed well-known pieces such as "Cornelli polka," "Vals in C" (Waltz in C), and "Førdeminner" (Memories of Førde). He was an honorary member of the Norwegian Accordionists' Association and various local associations such as the Mo Accordionists' Club (Mo Trekkspillubb).

Johansen died at the age of 88 and was laid to rest at the church in Haslum in Bærum, Norway.

Discography

With Sverre Cornelius Lund
 Spell og dans (1975)
 I ring og feiende sving (1976)

Solo albums
 Fagre Stryn (1963)
 Arnstein Johansens freskeste (1977)
 Don't Blame Me (1979)
 Arnstein Johansen Evergreens (1995)
 Arnstein Johansen Evergreens 2 (1996)
 Crazy Rhythm (1998)
 Out of Nowhere – Evergreens (2000)
 Too Late Now (2001)

Other releases
 Various artists: Ønskekassetten (1986)

Awards
 1996: Vågå Award (Vågåfatet), shared with Sverre Cornelius Lund
 2006: Albin Hagström Memorial Award

References

Norwegian jazz musicians
Jazz accordionists
Norwegian accordionists
Musicians from Fredrikstad
1925 births
2013 deaths